Kanu Banerjee (Kanu Bandyopadhyay) (20 June 1905 – 27 January 1983)  was an Indian actor and director of Bengali cinema and theatre. He is best known for his portrayal of Harihar Ray, father of Apu, in Satyajit Ray's classic Pather Panchali (1955) and Aparajito (1956), part of the Apu Trilogy. He was born in Jodhpur, Rajasthan, India. He first appeared as an amateur artiste with Sisir Kumar Bhaduri in Biraj Bou (1934) as Netai at Naba Natyyamandir. In 1955, he also appeared as saint Ramakrishna  in Prafulla Chakraborty’s biographical film Bhagaban  Sri Sri Ramakrishna.

Legacy
In 2012, his memoirs titled, Hariharer Panchali, based on his long interview published in Sharadiya (Durga puja) magazine Baro Maas in 1979 and other interviews was published by Sutradhar and released by Sandip Ray, son of Satyajit Ray, at Nandan theater in Kolkata. Previously, on 20 June 2012, on the occasion of his 108th birth anniversary, his statue was unveiled on Banamali Chatterjee Street in Tala neighbourhood of North Kolkata, where he used to stay.

Filmography
  
 Durgesh Nandini (1927)
 Rajgee (1937)
 Desher Mati (1938)
 Chanakya (1939)
 Rikta (1939)
 Shap Mukti (1940)
 Nandini (1941)
 Mayer Pran (1941)
 Epar Opar (1941)
 Pashan Devata (1942)
 Garmil (1942)
 Sahadharmini (1943)
 Jogajog (1943)
 Sahar Thekey Durey (1943)
 Pratikar (1944)
 Bideshini (1944)
 Nandita (1944)
 Mane Na Mane (1945)
 Kato Door (1945)
 Grihalakhmi (1945)
 Bhabhi Kaal (1945)
 Mandir (1946)
 Swapna-o-Sadhana (1947)
 Sadharan Meye (1948)
 Purabi (1948)
 Jayjatra (1948)
 Kuasha
 Abhijatya (1949)
 Digbhranta (1950)
 Mandanda (1950)
 Pandit Mashai (1951)
 Palli Samaj (1952)
 Bindur Chheley (1952)
 Natun Yahudi (1953)
 Sadanander Mela (1954)
 Mantra Shakti (1954)
 Dukhir Imaan (1954)
 Champadangar Bou (1954)
 Upahar (1955)
 Aparadhi (1955)
 Bhagavan Sri Ramakrishna (1955)<ref
  name=teleg2012/> 
 Pather Panchali (1955) — Harihar Ray
 Saheb Bibi Golam (1956)
 Nabajanma (1956)
 Daner Maryada (1956)
 Bhola Master (1956)
 Aparajito (1956) — Harihar Ray
 Aaj Kal Parshu (1961)
 Kathin Maya (1961)
 Ke Tumi? (1964)
 Banajyotsana (1969)
 Eai Korecho Bhalo (1971)
 Alo Amar Alo (1971)

References

External links
 
 Kanu Bandopadhyay filmography at Gomolo
 Kanu Bandopadhyay moviestills slideshow

1905 births
1985 deaths
Male actors in Bengali cinema
People from Rajasthan
University of Calcutta alumni
Indian male stage actors
Bengali theatre personalities
Indian male film actors
20th-century Indian male actors